The Parc de Saint-Cloud, officially the Domaine National de Saint-Cloud, is a domaine national (national estate), located mostly within Saint-Cloud, in the Hauts-de-Seine department, near Paris, France.

It is considered one of the most beautiful gardens in Europe, and in 2005 the park was awarded Notable Garden status. On 9 November 1994 the park was classified as a Historic Monument. In 1999 a winter storm heavily damaged the park's forests. The park is operated as a domaine national under the French Ministry of Culture.

History
The park is located on the site of the Château de Saint-Cloud, a residence of royal and imperial families from the 16th century. After Napoleon III declared war on the Prussians, the site was occupied by a Prussian force which used the high outcropping to shell Paris. Counter-fire from the French caused the building to burn on 13 October 1870. The structure was completely razed in August 1892.

Only a few outbuildings remain from the original structure. The park contains a Le Nôtre-designed garden in the French style, an English garden, and Marie Antoinette's rose garden.

The park showcases a panoramic view of Paris called "La Lanterne" or the "Lantern of Demosthenes".

Buildings and points of interest

Musée du château de Saint-Cloud: A five-room museum dedicated to the destroyed chateau
École Normale Supérieure (E.N.S.): Located in the Pavillon Valois
Bureau International des Poids et Mesures (B.I.P.M.): The International Bureau of Weights and Measures is located in the Pavillon de Breteuil; the building contains copies of the metre and kilogram standards.

Access
The park is accessible via Pont de Sèvres and Boulogne - Pont de Saint-Cloud metro stations. The T2 tramway runs along the eastern limit of the park.

External links

Domaine national de Saint-Cloud, official website
History of Saint-Cloud 

Saint-Cloud